Salantai is a small town in Lithuania. It is located in the Klaipėda County, Kretinga district.

Etymology
Salantai is named after the Salantas River, which runs through the town.

History

Salantai area was known to be inhabited since the Bronze Age - 1st millennium BC. Since 1556 Skilandžiai manor and town are mentioned. In 1567 town had a marketplace, 4 streets and 27 houses. In 1630 first church was built and since 1638 Skilandžiai was started to be named as Salantai. In 1667 parish school was founded. In 1668 Salantai was being named a town in which 66 families lived. In 1750 forty Catholic homes or homesteads (kiemas) were counted. A few years later, in 1765, the first enumeration of Jewish taxpayers found 279.

Aleksandras Bendikas, the Lithuanian book carrier and publisher settled in Salantai and since 1905 started to publish a calendar for the farmers Traveler, leaving to Samogitia and Lithuania (Keleivis, išeinąs į Žemaičius ir Lietuvą). A parson, canon Pranas Urbonavičius established a consumers' co-operative Kaukas in 1905, in 1906 opened a Lithuanian primary school Saulė for girls, and in 1906–1911 built church (archit. Karlas Eduardas Strandmanas).

This town is known for three famed rabbis: Rabbi Yisrael Lipkin Salanter and his teacher Rabbi Zundel Salant, rabbi Shmuel Salant, who spent most of his life in Salantai. Ashkenazi chief rabbi of Jerusalem between 1866 and 1910, also lived here before immigration. 
During the summer 1941, 95 Jews of the city were massacred in a mass execution by nazis and their local colaborants in the nearby forest.

Culture
The Orvydas Farmstead located on the outskirts of Salantai is a sculpture park created by the Lithuanian artist Vilius Orvydas.

External links

 Secondary School - History of Salantai
 Jews of Salantai
 History of Salantai town

References

 
Cities in Klaipėda County
Cities in Lithuania
Telshevsky Uyezd
Shtetls
Holocaust locations in Lithuania